Love, Lies and Murder is a 1991 American miniseries starring Clancy Brown, Sheryl Lee, Moira Kelly, Tom Bower, John Ashton, and Cynthia Nixon. It is based on the 1985 murder of Linda Bailey Brown and Ann Rule's book If You Really Loved Me.  The miniseries is four hours long and aired on NBC in two parts, the first on February 17, 1991 and the second on February 18, 1991.  Lifetime airs the miniseries.

Plot
In 1985, Cinnamon Brown kills her stepmother by shooting her.  Although she confessed to the crime, the lack of motive propels investigators to delve deeper into the case, and discover that there is far more to it than originally thought.

Cast
 Clancy Brown as David Brown
 Sheryl Lee as Patti Bailey
 Moira Kelly as Cinnamon Brown
 Shelley Morrison as Yolanda Brown
 Cathryn de Prume as Linda Bailey Brown
 Tom Bower as Leverette
 Ramon Bieri as Howard
 Cynthia Nixon as Donna
 Nestor Serrano as Gonzalez
 John M. Jackson as Sergeant Patterson
 John Ashton as Carrothers
 Steven Gilborn as Judge Cavanaugh

Reception
Ken Tucker of Entertainment Weekly gave the film an A− in his review. Love, Lies and Murder was released in DVD format on July 24, 2012. Contrary to what some believe, this DVD version is not a bootleg as it was released by CBS Home Entertainment as a DVD-R which is Manufactured On Demand. Love, Lies and Murder was also released on Home Video on January 27, 1992 as a two-tape set and as a four side two disc Laserdisc set.

The second part was the second-highest viewed primetime show for the week of February 18–24, 1991 while, however, the first part was the 23rd most-watched show of the prior week, where it was beat in the ratings by the special titled  Very Best of Ed Sullivan.

References

External links
 
TV Crime Sky | Cinnamon Brown: Where Is ‘If You Really Loved Me,’ Love, Lies, And Murder’ Killer Today?

1991 films
1990s crime drama films
American crime drama films
1990s American television miniseries
Films directed by Robert Markowitz
Films set in the 1980s
Crime films based on actual events
1991 drama films
American drama television films
1990s English-language films
1990s American films